Jonathan Earl Woods, known as Jon Woods (born August 23, 1977, in Charlotte, North Carolina), is a Republican former member of both houses of the Arkansas General Assembly, a record producer, and a musician. He is now in federal prison for political corruption, wire and mail fraud, and money laundering.

Woods served in the Arkansas House of Representatives from 2007 to 2013 and in the Arkansas Senate from 2013 to 2017. During his legislative career, he sponsored 103 bills that became law, pushed for the establishment of nearly a dozen task forces and commissions, and passed four constitutional amendments.

On March 1, 2017, Woods was found guilty of fifteen federal counts for his collusion in a kickback scheme involving Oren Paris, III, the president of Ecclesia College in Springdale, Arkansas, where Woods resides. Others indicted were Randell Shelton, Jr., of Alma in Crawford County, Arkansas, and Micah Neal, a former state representative who pleaded guilty to one act of conspiracy to commit honest services fraud.  The trial has been controversial due in part to the actions of the lead FBI agent, Robert Cessario, who pleaded guilty on August 18, 2022, to destroying exculpatory evidence.

He is the bass guitarist for the rock band, A Good Fight.

Background
In 1979, Woods and his family relocated from North Carolina to Blytheville in Mississippi County in eastern Arkansas. He attended Gosnell public schools through the ninth grade, where he played football, basketball, and ran track. He began his involvement in local and state government through the mentorship of Arkansas State Representative Ann Bush, a fellow Republican. Ann and her husband, Allen, part owners of Bush's Baked Beans, recruited Woods to join the Boy Scouts of America, in which he earned the rank of Eagle Scout.

Having grown up in the Arkansas Delta, Jon was heavily influenced by the music scene in nearby Memphis, Tennessee.

In 1993, at the end of Jon's freshman year of high school, his father was offered a job with Allen Canning located in Siloam Springs in Benton County, Arkansas. After relocating to Siloam Springs, Woods attended the John Brown University basketball camp during the summer before his sophomore year at which he met John W. Brown, who became a Special Operative Pararescueman and was killed in action the 2011 Chinook shootdown in Afghanistan.

During Woods' junior year at Siloam Springs High School, he attended Arkansas Boys State.  While in high school, Jon played football and basketball, but chose soccer rather than track. Several of the high school soccer team players were musicians, who inspired Woods to pick up the guitar more seriously. He also took private vocal lessons at John Brown University. During this time, fellow basketball and soccer player, musician, and close friend Tim Berry died in a car accident at the age of sixteen. Years later, Tim would be the inspiration for the band name, A Good Fight, named for the verse in II Timothy 4:7. During his high school and college years, Woods lifeguarded at the Siloam Springs municipal pool and Dawn Hill Country Club, where he also taught private swimming lessons. Upon graduation in 1996, Woods attended Northwest Arkansas Community College in Bentonville. He obtained two degrees, an Associate of Arts and an Associate of Science in Business.

He continued his education at the University of Arkansas in Fayetteville, and served in the Associated Student Government Senate. He was elected chairman of the College Republicans and stayed involved with the Republican committees of Benton and Washington counties. He was a member of the Pi Kappa Alpha fraternity, Alpha Zeta chapter and was a member of the intramural soccer team for the fraternity. While at the University, Jon completed an internship at the Arkansas Small Business and Technology Development Center, at which he helped small businesses develop through market research and business development. During this time, his non-college activities included taking private drum, guitar and bass lessons. He graduated with a Bachelor of Arts in Business Administration with a focus on Marketing Management from the Sam Walton College of Business at UA-Fayetteville in 2002.

After graduation, Woods took a job in commercial banking in Benton and Washington counties. He co-founded the pop rock band A Good Fight, in 2004, and in 2006, at the age of twenty-nine, was elected to the Arkansas House of Representatives and was sworn in on January 8, 2007 as the youngest member of the Arkansas 86th General Assembly.

Music background
Growing up in the Arkansas Delta, Woods and his brother, Dustin, were heavily influenced by the Memphis Music Scene and events held on Mud Island during the 1980s and early 1990s.

In 1993, after the family relocated from the Delta to Siloam Springs, Dustin Woods began to practice the guitar and was named most talented his senior year, 1997, at Siloam Springs High School. Dustin Woods had two bands in high school, and both performed in talent shows in his junior and senior years. Because of Jon Woods' interest in politics and sports, he was not as devoted to music as his brother during his high school years.

In 2004, Jon and Dustin Woods and Sean Marriott formed A Good Fight. After a two-year period with thirty auditions, the Woods' and Merriott agreed to select Eddie Love as lead vocalist in 2006. The band released two albums, The City Could Be Ours By Morning in 2008 and self-titled album A Good Fight in 2010. Both albums had songs featured on several reality shows on MTV and Sony PlayStation's MLB 13: The Show. In a short period of time the band performed at several large venues such as the SXSW Music Festival in Austin, Texas.

While in the legislature in 2009, Woods supported HB1837, Act 497, by J. R. Rogers of Walnut Ridge. This Act designated a portion of Highway 67 in Northeastern Arkansas to be called "Rock 'N' Roll Highway". Some of the legendary musicians who regularly traveled on this stretch of highway during the 1950s and 1960s included Elvis Presley, Johnny Cash, Jerry Lee Lewis, Carl Perkins, Roy Orbison, Conway Twitty, Fats Domino, and Sonny Burgess. The goal of this legislation was to honor Arkansas' Rock 'N' Roll heritage, and to boost tourism and economic development for the region. Woods also advocated, although unsuccessfully, for moving the Arkansas Entertainers Hall of Fame from the Pine Bluff Convention Center to the River Market District in Little Rock so that the hall of fame would gain more exposure. The hall of fame houses personal possessions and items of Arkansas musicians and celebrities.

In 2011, Woods produced The Plaid Jackets first album The New Adventures of the Plaid Jackets Vol 1, which featured the international hit "Adam West is Batman". This song is featured on the documentary, Starring Adam West.

Political career 
Restricted by term limits that then allowed only three terms in the state House of Representatives, Woods decided to run for the Arkansas State Senate for District 7, which includes most of Springdale, Tontitown, Goshen, Elkins, Durham and parts of Fayetteville and all of eastern Washington County. In 2012, Woods was elected to the Arkansas State Senate. In 2015, Woods received an award from the American Red Cross for performing life saving CPR on a visitor to the Arkansas State Capitol.

Arkansas House of Representatives 2007-2013

2007-2009 86th General Assembly
During his first term he showed his ability to bring people of differing points of view together by making Arkansas' first Umbilical Cord Blood Bank a reality. This institution harvests primitive stem cells from umbilical cords, helping advance stem cell research without abandoning his pro-life convictions. Along with Senator Johnny Key, Woods was awarded the Invest in Life
award for his work on the project.

2009-2011 87th General Assembly
In his second term during the 87th General Assembly in 2009, he became the chair of the technology committee, an unheard of feat for a second term member from the minority party. He sponsored legislation that helped amend the Arkansas State Constitution granting the citizens of Arkansas the right to hunt, fish, trap, and harvest wildlife. It was referred to the voters in 2010 where it passed with 612,495 votes or 82.78% of the vote with 127,444 or 17.22% voting against.

2011-2013 88th General Assembly
In his third and final term in the Arkansas House of Representatives in the 88th General Assembly in 2011, Woods took on sex offenders, increasing the penalties for sex crimes  and expanding notification to the public about sex offenders living in their neighborhoods.  He also sponsored legislation to create the Office of Health Information Technology to implement electronic health records in Arkansas  and co-sponsored legislation to create a state sales tax holiday weekend for families to buy school supplies.

Arkansas State Senate 2013-2017

2013-2015 89th General Assembly
Woods served on the Senate Insurance and Commerce, Joint Performance Review, Public Retirement & Social Security Programs, and Judiciary committees as well as the Arkansas Legislative Council. Woods sponsored Carter's Law in 2013, creating a comprehensive program of education regarding shaken baby syndrome.

2015-2017 90th General Assembly 
In the 90th General Assembly Woods earned the highest civilian recognition from the Arkansas National Guard, and referred his third and fourth ballot measures to the voters.

Political Investigations

Dismissed complaint
In March 2016, Jeff Oland of Farmington, Arkansas filed a complaint with the Arkansas Ethics Commission against then State Senator Jon Woods. Oland accused then State Senator Jon Woods of coordinating mailers from his previous 2012-election campaign with a conservative organization called Conservative Arkansas PAC. Oland's complaint triggered an investigation by the Arkansas Ethics Commission. After more than a dozen interviews and reviewing all the evidence, the Ethics Commission determined that there had been no violations and no laws broken. In May 2016, the Ethics Commission voted 3-0 to dismiss Mr. Oland's complaint against Woods.

Wire fraud, honest services fraud, money laundering
On March 1, 2017, Woods was indicted for his alleged collusion in a kickback scheme involving Oren Paris, III, president of Ecclesia College (a Christian college), and Randell Shelton, Jr. Woods' attorney, Patrick Benca, has denied the allegations.

The trial date has been delayed several times and was most recently delayed due to the destruction of evidence by FBI agent Robert Cessario. According to his own court testimony, Cessario wiped his undercover computer clean on three separate occasions since the investigation began.  He had it wiped once professionally, then wiped it at least twice more himself.  In December, 2017 he was removed from the case and is under investigation by the Office of Inspector General, according to court documents, and may be facing criminal prosecution.

FBI computer wipe 

Two days of pretrial hearings, January 25 and 26, 2018, laid out in detail the circumstances under which the FBI (Cessario's) computer was used to collect copies of the audio files recorded covertly by former State Representative Micah Neal.  Mr. Neal has denied that the government asked him to conduct the undercover audio recordings and testified that the "pen" used as the recording device was his idea.  However, the FBI agent improperly wiped his laptop sometime in early 2017, December 4, 2017 and then wiped it again December 7, 2017. The erasing of the files cast doubt on whether a true copy of all the files was ever provided to the defense or if the FBI had in fact requested Micah Neal conduct the recordings.  Thirty nine audio recordings were provided to the defense in April, 2017. Gaps in the timeline of the recordings were discovered by the defense, which led them to request that the U.S. Attorney turn over ALL of the audio recordings. This request resulted in the U.S. Attorney finding an additional 79 audio recordings in November 2017.  These audios contained recordings of many different people.  The words Mr. Neal himself used in these recordings is possibly evidence that he was actually doing the recordings on behalf of the government. Upon cross examination of why FBI agent Robert Cessario wiped his laptop, the agent said it was because the government owned laptop contained his personal medical records and he didn't want those to become public. Defense attorney Patrick Benca pointed out that Robert Cessario plans a medical malpractice suit that will make his medical issues public record anyway and the excuse of wiping the laptop to prevent medical records from being made public doesn't pass the smell test. FBI agent Robert Cessario acknowledged that he does plan on suing his doctor, but said any lawsuit he files is unlikely to get the attention the Woods case has received.

"Do you think what you did was proper?" asked Chad Atwell, attorney for one of Woods' co-defendants. "No. I should not have done that," Cessario replied.

On August 17, 2022, Robert Cessario pleaded guilty to corrupt destruction of record in an official proceeding.

Micah Neal law firm computer crash 

U.S. District Judge Timothy Brooks wondered aloud from the bench Friday, January 26, 2018, why attorneys in the case did not get pristine copies from the computer in the law office of Neal's attorney, Shane Wilkinson of Bentonville, Arkansas.

Assistant U.S. Attorney Kenneth Elser then told Judge Brooks that late Thursday, January 25, 2018, the FBI sent a computer forensics examiner to Shane Wilkinson's office to make copies of specific files. Mr. Elser then submitted a flash drive to the court which he said contained those specific files. However, upon cross-examination (by the defense) of the expert who collected the copies, it was only then revealed that the files were not taken from the law firm's original hard drive that had stored the audio directly from Neal. The expert had been informed by Mr. Wilkinson's paralegal, Karri Layton, that the hard drive crashed on December 27, 2017, and the whole computer had been replaced, which gives the appearance of a coverup between Micah Neal's attorney Shane Wilkinson and the FBI and the Department of Justice.

Defense Attorney Chad Atwell of Fayetteville conducted the cross-examination of FBI computer forensics examiner, Rebecca Passmore. It was during this lengthy cross examination that Ms. Passmore revealed the Dec. 27 crash and that the original hard drive was nowhere to be found. "I am at a loss for words," Atwell said, when asked for comment after the hearing. "Our pristine copy just went up in smoke," said defense attorney Shelly Koehler of Fayetteville.

It was ordered by the court that an investigation be conducted on Feb. 7, 2018, with the help of FBI computer forensics expert, Amy Corrigan, to search for the original hard drive to Wilkinson's law office computer. It was later revealed that attorney Shane Wilkinson had his hard drive replaced at Megabyte in Bentonville, Arkansas and that Megabyte had backed up his hard drive. Once the backup was reviewed an additional audio was recovered that the DOJ and defense had never heard. In all, 39 audios were given to the defense in April 2017, 79 additional audios in November 2017, and one audio was discovered in February 2018 for a total of 119 audio files (140 hours) which were covertly recorded by Micah Neal.

Conviction
Woods of Springdale, Arkansas, was accused of soliciting and accepting kickbacks for the distribution of government funds. He was found guilty of conspiracy to commit mail fraud, twelve counts of wire fraud, and money laundering. Woods was sentenced by Judge Timothy Brooks to 220 months in federal prison and ordered to pay $1.6 million in restitution on September 6, 2018. Brooks ordered Woods to serve less than the Federal sentencing guidelines, which called for a term between 324–405 months.

Appeal to the Eighth Circuit 
Following conviction, Woods stated his intent to appeal his conviction to the United States Court of Appeals for the Eighth Circuit.

Woods appealed his trial to the United States Court of Appeals for the Eighth Circuit, arguing that the district court erred in denying Woods' motion to dismiss based on the destruction of data by the FBI. On October 16, 2020, the Circuit Court affirmed the district court's conviction, finding that the destroyed evidence lacked exculpatory value and that the information was available by other means.

In April 2022, Woods filed a new appeal to the United States Court of Appeals for the Eighth Circuit. It was unanimously rejected on August 31, 2022; the panel held that “the purportedly newly discovered evidence buttressed rather than rebutted the case against Woods and was immaterial or previously available”.

Election history

References

External links
 Campaign website

1977 births
Living people
21st-century American criminals
21st-century American politicians
American bankers
American fraudsters
American money launderers
Arkansas politicians convicted of crimes
American rock bass guitarists
American male bass guitarists
Republican Party Arkansas state senators
Republican Party members of the Arkansas House of Representatives
Musicians from Charlotte, North Carolina
Northwest Arkansas Community College alumni
People from Blytheville, Arkansas
People from Siloam Springs, Arkansas
People from Springdale, Arkansas
Arkansas politicians convicted of corruption
Politicians from Charlotte, North Carolina
Siloam Springs High School alumni
University of Arkansas alumni
21st-century American bass guitarists
21st-century American male musicians